The following is a list of notable deaths in January 2001.

Entries for each day are listed alphabetically by surname. A typical entry lists information in the following sequence:
 Name, age, country of citizenship at birth, subsequent country of citizenship (if applicable), reason for notability, cause of death (if known), and reference.

January 2001

1
Madeleine Barbulée, 90, French actress.
Sir Michael Hanley, 82, British intelligence officer, Director-General of MI5.
Constantin Rădulescu, 76, Romanian doctor, footballer and manager.
Fabijan Šovagović, 68, Croatian actor and writer.
Ray Walston, 86, American actor (My Favorite Martian, Fast Times at Ridgemont High, Picket Fences), Emmy winner (1995, 1996).

2
Sir Ewart Bell, 76, Northern Irish rugby player and civil servant.
George Carman, 71, English barrister, prostate cancer.
Sylvia Hahn, 89, Canadian artist.
George Ludford, 85, English professional footballer.
William P. Rogers, 87, American politician, diplomat and lawyer. (United States Attorney General, United States Secretary of State), congestive heart failure.
Jimmy Zámbó, 42, Hungarian pop singer, accidental suicide by gunshot.

3
Kwang-chih Chang, 69–70, Taiwanese-American archaeologist and sinologist.
Jack Fleming, 77, American sports announcer (Pittsburgh Steelers, Chicago Bulls, West Virginia Mountaineers).
Marty Glickman, 83, American radio announcer.
John F. Hayes, 85, American politician (Brooklyn Borough President).
Kung Fu, 49, Mexican Luchador, arterial hyper tension.
Orlando Pantera, 33, Cape Verdean singer and composer, acute pancreatitis.
Alex Sabo, 90, American baseball player.
Daddy Zemus, 32, Zambian musician and songwriter.

4
Les Brown, 88, American swing bandleader ("Sentimental Journey") (Les Brown and His Band of Renown), lung cancer.
H. Ross Hume, 78, American distance runner.
Pierre Leyris, 93, French translator.
Clementino Ocampos, 87, Paraguayan composer and poet.
John Rhoden, 82, American sculptor.
Bob Snyder, 87, American football player and coach.
Hilda Stevenson-Delhomme, 88, Seychellois politician and doctor.
André Thirion, 93, French writer and political activist.
Villano I, 50, Mexican professional wrestler, heart attack following a cerebral haemorrhage.
Yoshika Yuhnagi, 17, Japanese fashion model, hypothermia.

5
G. E. M. Anscombe, 81, British analytic philosopher.
James F. Hamlet, 79, United States Army Major General and division commander.
Milan Hlavsa, 49, Czech songwriter and bass guitarist (Plastic People of the Universe), lung cancer.
Stanley S. Hughes, 82, United States Marine Corps colonel.
William J. Maddox Jr, 79, United States Army aviator.
Nancy Parsons, 58, American actress (Porky's), congestive heart failure.
James Phiri, 32, Zambian footballer, cancer.

6
Victor Braun, 65, Canadian baritone, Shy–Drager syndrome.
John Denison, 84, Canadian ice road engineer.
Nadezhda Grekova, 90, Soviet/Belarusian politician.
Peter Lovell-Davis, Baron Lovell-Davis, 76, British publisher and politician.
Scott Marlowe, 68, American actor (Executive Suite, Murder, She Wrote).
Tom Poholsky, 71, American baseball player.
Bob Pratt, 88, Australian rules footballer.
Tot Pressnell, 94, American baseball player.
Pretaap Radhakishun, 66, Surinamese politician.
Gene Taylor, 53, American media personality and writer, asthma attack.

7
Frederick Baldwin Adams Jr., 90, American bibliophile.
Charles Cameron, 73, Scottish magician.
James Carr, 58, American rhythm and blues singer.
Ken Durrett, 52, American professional basketball player (Cincinnati Royals / Kansas City-Omaha Kings, Philadelphia 76ers).
František Hájek, 85, Czechoslovakian Olympic basketball player (men's basketball at the 1936 Summer Olympics).
Johan van der Keuken, 62, Dutch documentary filmmaker, author, and photographer.
Joseph L. Melnick, 86, American epidemiologist and virologist.
Lowell Perry, 69, American gridiron football player and coach, businessman, and broadcaster.

8
Don Brodie, 96, American actor and director.
Edwin Etherington, 76, American writer, lawyer, civil rights advocate, and president of the American Stock Exchange.
Chris Evert, 30, American Thoroughbred racehorse, euthanized.
Bert Hodges, 83, American baseball player.
Néstor Scotta, 52, Argentine football striker, car accident.
Catherine Storr, 87, English children's writer.

9
Paul Vanden Boeynants, 81, Belgian politician, Prime Minister (1978–1979), pneumonia.
Peter Düttmann, 77, German World War II Luftwaffe flying ace.
Judith Trim, 57, English studio potter, breast cancer.
Carol Voges, 75, Dutch illustrator and comics artist.

10
Jalal Chandio, 57, Indian folk singer, kidney failure.
Necati Cumalı, 79, Turkish writer and poet, liver cancer.
Bryan Gregory, 49, American rock musician, heart failure.
Jacques Marin, 81, French actor.
John G. Schmitz, 70, American politician, prostate cancer.
Muhammad ibn al-Uthaymeen, 75, Saudi Salafi scholar.
Esteban Vicente, 97, American painter.

11
Wanda Jean Allen, 41, American convicted murderer, execution by lethal injection.
Ken Brown, 55, American professional football player (Cleveland Browns: 1970–1975).
Princess Vera Constantinovna of Russia, 94, Russian noblewoman and monarchist.
Oliver Gurney, 89, British Assyriologist.
Dorothy M. Horstmann, 89, American epidemiologist, virologist and pediatrician, Alzheimer's disease.
Sir Denys Lasdun, 86, British architect.
Lorna Sage, 57, British literary critic and writer.
Michael Williams, 65, British actor.

12
Affirmed, 25, American racehorse, euthanasia after contracting laminitis.
Luiz Bonfá, 78, Brazilian guitarist and composer.
William Hewlett, 87, American co-founder of Hewlett-Packard, heart failure.
Mariano Juaristi, 96, Spanish Basque pelota player.
Vladimir Semichastny, 76, Soviet politician, stroke.
Elizabeth Sewell, 81, British-American critic, poet, and novelist.
Jack Shearer, 74, Northern Irish priest, Dean of Belfast.
Adhemar da Silva, 73, Brazilian triple jumper and Olympic champion.
Ibnu Sutowo, 86, Indonesian army officer, politician and businessman.
C. Malcolm Watkins, 89, American historian, archaeologist, and curator.

13
Michael Cuccione, 16, Canadian actor and musician, respiratory failure.
Bill Fraser, 76, New Zealand politician.
Amando de Ossorio, 82, Spanish film director.

14
Luigi Broglio, 89, Italian aerospace engineer.
Jim Coleman, 89, Canadian sports journalist and writer.
József Csermák, 68, Hungarian hammer thrower.
Dennis Fitzgerald, 64, American freestyle wrestler and football player and coach.
Burkhard Heim, 75, German theoretical physicist.
Kostas Rigopoulos, 70, Greek actor, stroke.
Vic Wilson, 69, British racing driver.
Joe Zapustas, 93, Latvian-American baseball player.

15
Alex Blignaut, 68, South African racing driver and racing team owner, domestic accident.
Bob Braun, 71, American local television personality and actor (Die Hard 2, Defending Your Life).
Bert Corona, 82, American labor and civil rights leader.
David Lapsley, 76, Scottish footballer.
Ted Mann, 84, American businessman (Mann Theatres) and film producer (Brubaker, Krull).
Leo Marks, 80, British World War II cryptographer, cancer.

16
C. Arnold Beevers, 92, British crystallographer.
Thomas Hart, 91, Scottish cricketer and rugby player.
Laurent-Désiré Kabila, 61, Congolese politician and President, shot.
Richard MacNeish, 82,  American archaeologist.
Melvin McQuaid, 89, Canadian politician.
Virginia O'Brien, 81, American actress (Lady Be Good, Ship Ahoy, Ziegfeld Follies).
Jitendra Prasada, 62, Indian politician and Vice-President of the Indian National Congress, cerebral haemorrhage.
Jules Vuillemin, 80, French philosopher.
Auberon Waugh, 61, British journalist and author.
Leonard Woodcock, 89, American trade unionist and diplomat (President of the U.A.W., U.S. ambassador to the People's Republic of China).

17
Gregory Corso, 70, American poet (Beat Generation).
Luise Ermisch, 84, German political activist and communist.
Tom Kilburn, 79, British computer scientist.
Richard Kraft, 64, South African Anglican Bishop.
Sergej Kraigher, 86, Yugoslav politician, President of Slovenia.
P. R. Kurup, 85, Indian socialist leader.
Robert Robertson, 70, British actor and director, heart attack.
Rito Romero, 73, Mexican professional wrestler.
Wakabayama Sadao, 78, Japanese sumo wrestler, cerebral thrombosis.

18
Allan Percy Fleming, 88, Australian public servant, National Librarian at the National Library of Australia.
Mordechai Gifter, 85, American orthodox rabbi.
Zip Hanna, 84, American professional football player (South Carolina, Washington Redskins).
Morris Lapidus, 98, Russian-American architect, heart failure.
Reg Prentice, 77, British politician and government minister.
Imre Sinkovits, 72, Hungarian actor.
Boris Stenin, 66, Soviet speed skater and speed skating coach.
Al Waxman, 65, Canadian actor and director (King of Kensington, Cagney & Lacey).

19
Leonard Ashton, 86, British Anglican prelate.
Johnny Babich, 87, American baseball player.
Andy Dudish, 82, American gridiron football player, complications from pneumonia.
Alberto Gallardo, 60, Peruvian football player and manager.
Lille Graah, 92, Norwegian journalist, radio announcer and reporter.
Sir Roderick Macdonald, 79, British admiral.
Maxine Mesinger, 75, American newspaper columnist (Houston Chronicle), complications of multiple sclerosis.
Paul Olum, 82, American mathematician.
Ian Taylor, 56, British sociologist.
Gustave Thibon, 97, French philosopher and author.

20
Rønnaug Alten, 90, Norwegian actress and stage instructor.
Eddie Donovan, 78, American professional basketball coach and executive (New York Knicks).
Beverley Peck Johnson, 96, American voice teacher, soprano, and pianist.
Crispin Nash-Williams, 68, British mathematician.

21
Sasidharan Arattuvazhi, 45, Indian playwright and screenwriter, cirrhosis.
Sandy Baron, 64, American stand-up comic, actor (Seinfeld) and songwriter, emphysema.
Byron De La Beckwith, 80, American white supremacist and Klansman.
Bud Dunn, 82, American horse trainer, heart attack.
Joseph O'Conor, 84, Irish actor and playwright.
Emlyn Walters, 82, British rugby player.

22
Tommie Agee, 58, American baseball player.
Tuomas Anhava, 73, Finnish writer.
Roy Brown, 68, American television personality, puppeteer and clown (The Bozo Show).
Sir Alistair Grant, 63, British businessman.

23
Clayton Fritchey, 96, American journalist.
Lou Levy, 72, American jazz pianist, heart attack.
Jack McDuff, 74, American jazz organist, heart failure.
Fred Ray, 80, American comic book artist (Superman, Tomahawk).
Bill Reinhardt, 92, American clarinetist and bandleader.

24
Steve Dowden, 71, American gridiron football player (Baylor University, Green Bay Packers).
Johannes Hörnig, 79, East German politician.
Gaffar Okkan, 49, Turkish police chief, assassinated.
Ian Scott, 67, Australian Rotarian.

25
Alice Ambrose, 94, American philosopher, logician, and author.
John T. Biggers, 76, African-American muralist.
Aleksandr Chudakov, 79, Soviet Russian physicist.
Pamela Cunningham Copeland, 94, American horticulturist.
Vijaya Raje Scindia, 81, Indian political personality.
Margaret Scriven, 88, British tennis player.
Dare Wright, 86, Canadian–American children's author, model, and photographer.

26
Murray Edelman, 81, American political scientist.
Al McGuire, 74, American college basketball coach (Marquette University) and television commentator.
Diane Whipple, 33, American lacrosse player and college coach, dog attack.

27
Pedro Carrasco, 57, Spanish boxer.
Tommy Luther, 92, American horse racing jockey.
Sally Mansfield, 77, American actress, lung cancer.
Marie José of Belgium, 94, the last Queen of Italy.
André Prévost, 66, Canadian music composer and instructor (Order of Canada).
Robert Alexander Rankin, 85, Scottish mathematician.
Hachiya Toshiyuki, 50, Japanese sumo wrestler, cancer.
Sir Colin Woods, 80, British police officer.

28
Curt Blefary, 57, American baseball player.
Al Fiorentino, 83, American professional football player (Washington Redskins, Boston Yanks).
Earl Ben Gilliam, 69, American judge (United States district judge of the United States District Court for the Southern District of California).
Ellen Hammer, 79, American historian.
Stephen Malcolm, 30, Jamaican international football player, car accident.
Sally Mansfield, 80, American actress.
Ranko Marinković, 87, Croatian novelist and dramatist.
Thikkodiyan, 84, Indian playwright, novelist and lyricist.

29
Frances Bible, 82, American operatic mezzo-soprano (New York City Opera).
Julia Bodmer, 66, British geneticist.
Edmund Fuller, 86, American educator, novelist, historian, and literary critic (The Wall Street Journal, Saturday Review, New York Herald Tribune, The New York Times).
Pablo Hernán Gómez, 23, Argentine football player, traffic accident.
Thomas C. Lea III, 93, American muralist, illustrator, novelist, and historian.
Simon Phipps, 79,  British Anglican prelate, Bishop of Lincoln.
Ninian Smart, 73, Scottish religious scholar.

30
Jean-Pierre Aumont, 90, French actor, heart attack.
David Heneker, 94, British composer and lyricist (Irma La Douce, Half a Sixpence, Charlie Girl'').
Johnnie Johnson, 85, British World War II fighter pilot.
O. Winston Link, 86, American photographer.
Rodolfo Morales, 75, Mexican painter.
John Prebble, 85, British journalist and historian.
Joseph Ransohoff, 85, American neurosurgeon.
John Vernon Taylor, 86, British Anglican bishop.

31
Gordon R. Dickson, 77, American science fiction writer, asthma.
Betty Kenward, 94, British magazine columnist.
José Medel, 62, Mexican featherweight boxer.
Frederick Scott, 58, British designer.

References 

2001-01
 01